Premier Division may refer to

Association football 
 Antigua and Barbuda Premier Division
 Barbados Premier Division
 Bermudian Premier Division
 Gibraltar Premier Division
 Premier Division of the Isthmian League, England
 Liga Indonesia Premier Division
 League of Ireland Premier Division, Republic of Ireland
 Premier Division of the Leicestershire Senior League, England
 Premier Division of the North West Counties Football League, England
 Premier Division of the Northern Counties East Football League, England
 Northern Premier League Premier Division, England
 Premier Division of the Oxfordshire Senior Football League, England
 Scottish Football League Premier Division (1975–1998)
 South African Premier Division
 Santiago South Premier Division
 Premier Division of the South West Peninsula League, England
 Premier Division of the Wessex Football League, England
 West Cork League, Premier Division, Wales
 Premier Division of the Western Football League, England

Other sports 
 Premier Division (shinty), Scotland
 Premier Division of the British Hockey League, ice hockey
 Premier Division of the Malaysia Hockey League, field hockey
 Premier Division of the Currie Cup, rugby union, South Africa
 A former name for Division I (US bandy)